Maria Brigitta Catherina "Ria" Beckers-de Bruijn (2 November 1938 – 22 March 2006) was a Dutch politician of the Political Party of Radicals (PPR) and later co-founder of the GroenLinks (GL) party and teacher.

Career before politics
In 1956 Beckers completed the gymnasium, in which she took all courses and did not major in either sciences or arts. She continued to study Latin and Greek at the University of Utrecht. From 1962 she taught these languages at high schools in Haarlem and Leiden. Her thesis concerned the position of women in Greek Tragedy.

In the 1970s she had become active in the progressive Christian political party Politieke Partij Radicalen (PPR). Beckers had a Catholic background. She became a member of the PPR board in 1973 as vice-chairperson. In 1974 she was elected chairperson of the PPR.

Political career
In 1977 Beckers was elected lijsttrekker of the PPR. This was remarkable because she was not a member of parliament at the time. The young Beckers was expected to perform better under young voters than the then political leader Bas de Gaay Fortman. She was the first female lijsttrekker in Dutch politics. In the 1977 elections the PPR lost four of its seven seats. Beckers nonetheless remained political leader and led the PPR in the 1981, 1982 and 1986 elections. In these elections the party got between two and three seats. Under her leadership the PPR broke its links with the PvdA and oriented itself to the more left-wing parties PSP, CPN and EVP. The PPR was no longer interested in governing but instead chose to testify to its ideals.

In 1989 the PPR merged with these left-wing parties to become the GroenLinks. Beckers was elected lijsttrekker of the new formation. In the 1989 elections the GroenLinks got a disappointing six seats. Beckers remained political leader of the GroenLinks until 1993, when she stood down for a new generation. She had been political leader of her party for sixteen years. When she left parliament in 1993 prime-minister Lubbers praised her by saying "you gave us (the government) a lot of trouble".

In parliament Beckers took special interest in promoting organic farming and peace.

Later career
After leaving politics Beckers became involved in green NGOs: she was chairperson of the Platform Biologica, which promotes organic agriculture, from 1993 to 2004. She was chairperson the Foundation for Nature and the Environment since 1994 for ten years. After she left these positions in 2004 she was made Officer in the Order of Orange Nassau.
After that she held several positions in advisory boards, for instance of the green Triodos-bank and Research Centre of Wageningen University.

In 2006 Beckers died after a long illness. After her death she was praised for being an authentic, compassionate and idealistic politician, who stood far from the televised political theater of today.

Personal life
Beckers was married and had three children, one of whom was adopted.

Beckers lived most of her life in Wadenoijen, which is near the Linge river. For years she protested against the creation of bigger dikes against the river. Ironically, in 1995, she had to be evacuated from her house, because the dikes were expected to be not strong enough to hold back the river.

Decorations

References

External links

Official
  Drs. M.B.C. (Ria) Beckers-de Bruijn Parlement & Politiek

 

|-

|-

|-

 

1938 births
2006 deaths
Chairmen of the Political Party of Radicals
Dutch academic administrators
Dutch Christian pacifists
Dutch conservationists
Dutch nonprofit directors
Dutch nonprofit executives
Dutch Roman Catholics
Dutch political activists
Dutch political party founders
Dutch women activists
Dutch activists
Dutch women environmentalists
GroenLinks politicians
Knights of the Order of the Netherlands Lion
Leaders of GroenLinks
Leaders of the Political Party of Radicals
Members of the House of Representatives (Netherlands)
Officers of the Order of Orange-Nassau
People from Tiel
People from Driebergen-Rijsenburg
Political Party of Radicals politicians
Utrecht University alumni
20th-century Dutch educators
20th-century Dutch women politicians
20th-century Dutch politicians